The Right Words (French: Haut les coeurs) is a 2021 French short film directed by Adrian Moyse Dullin and co-written with Emma Benestan. The fifteen-minute short was filmed in the Parisian suburbs. It follows a group of young teenagers on a bus journey.

The short has been presented at a number of festivals, including Cannes Film Festival, Sundance Film Festival, Chicago International Film Festival, and won awards at Palm Springs International ShortFest and Stockholm Film Festival.

Plot 

During a bus ride, thirteen-year-old Mahdi's older sister, Kenza, dares Mahdi to declare his love to his crush, Jada. Pressured by Kenza, Mahdi talks to Jada.

Awards

References

External links 
 The Right Words at Ubiquarian.
The Right Words at Variety.
Official Trailer on YouTube.
The Right Words at Unifrance.

2021 films
2021 short films
Films about teenagers
French short films
Films about social media